Lendou-en-Quercy (literally Lendou in Quercy) is a commune in the department of Lot, southern France. The municipality was established on 1 January 2018 by merger of the former communes of Saint-Cyprien, Saint-Laurent-Lolmie and Lascabanes.

The town hall is located in the village of Saint-Cyprien.

Main sights 
 Saint-Laurent church, built in the early 16th century
 The church of Lolmie, slightly modified in the 19th century

See also 
Communes of the Lot department

References 

 
Communes of Lot (department)